Mite Yine (born April 26, 1992) is a Burmese Lethwei fighter who competes in the World Lethwei Championship's Featherweight division. He is a former Lethwei Golden Belt champion, having won the title in 2015 and 2016. 

Yine has also represented Myanmar in Muay Thai at the 2013 SEA Games and competitions at the 2013 Asian Indoor and Martial Arts Games, winning the gold medal.

Lethwei career 
On June 14, 2015, Mite Yine defeated Moe Hein by 3rd-round knockout to win the 2015 Lethwei Golden Belt Featherweight (57 kg) World Championship.

Mite Yine defeated Nat Khat Aung by decision on July 10, 2016 to win the 2016 Lethwei Golden Belt Featherweight World Championship.

World Lethwei Championship 
On November 4, 2017, Mite Yine made his World Lethwei Championship debut at WLC 3: Legendary Champions, where he defeated Pha Kyaw Hae by unanimous decision.

On June 2, 2018, he lost to Antonio Faria by TKO at WLC 5: Knockout War.

On September 29, 2018, Mite Yine lost to Pich Mtes Khmang via split decision at WLC 6: Heartless Tigers.

In 2018, he competed as a mixed martial artist who in the Flyweight division of ONE Championship.
Mite Yine would defeat Morn Samet by split decision at WLC 8: Karen Spirit.

On October 11, 2019, he defeated Nguyen Thanh Trung by unanimous decision at WLC 10: Fearless Tigers.

Mixed martial arts career

ONE Championship
As part of World Lethwei Championship's partnership with ONE Championship, Mite Yine became one of many fighters shared between the two organizations. This also allowed him to participate in MMA-rules fights under the ONE Championship banner.

On June 29, 2018, Mite Yine won his mixed martial arts debut in ONE Championship's Flyweight division, defeating Saw Darwait in Yangon, Myanmar at ONE Championship: Spirit Of A Warrior. On October 26, 2018, Mite Yine lost to Ye Thway Ne by unanimous decision at ONE Championship: Pursuit of Greatness in Yangon.

Muay Thai career
Mite Yine, competing under his real name of Saw Dar Pot, was one of six ethnic Karen boxers (including Saw Nga Man) selected as a representative of Myanmar in Muay Thai at the 2013 Southeast Asian Games held in Naypyidaw. At the SEA Games, he competed in the men's 54 kg category and defeated Phillip Delarmino of the Philippines to win the gold medal at 54 kg.

In addition to the Southeast Asian Games, Mite Yine has also competed in Muay Thai at the 2013 Asian Indoor and Martial Arts Games.

Titles
 2016 Lethwei Golden Belt – Featherweight World Champion
 2015 Lethwei Golden Belt – Featherweight World Champion

Lethwei record

|- style="background:#c5d2ea;"
| 2022-12-22 || Draw || align="left" | Hein Tun Aung || Kyar Inn Challenge Fights || Hlaingbwe Township, Myanmar || Draw || 5 || 3:00
|- style="background:#c5d2ea;"
| 2022-11-09 || Draw || align="left" | Thway Lin Htet || 67th Karen State Day || Hpa-an Township, Myanmar || Draw || 5 || 3:00
|- style="background:#fbb;"
| 2022-03-27 || Loss || align="left" | Eh Mwi|| Hlakazaing Challenge Fights || Hlaingbwe Township, Myanmar || TKO || 3 || 
|- style="background:#fbb;"
| 2022-02-14 || Loss || align="left" | Ye Thway Ni|| Lethwei Challenge Fight || Kyain Seikgyi Township, Myanmar || TKO || 2 || 
|- style="background:#cfc;"
| 2022-02-02 || Win || align="left" | Suphabnoi Sor.Jor.Piek-Uthai|| Myanmar vs. Thailand Challenge Fights ||Myawaddy Township, Myanmar || KO || 2 ||
|- style="background:#cfc;"
| 2022-01-03 || Win || align="left" | Pat Kyaw Lin Naing|| Taung Ka Lay New Year Challenge Fights ||Hpa-an Township, Myanmar || TKO || 3 ||
|- style="background:#c5d2ea;"
| 2021-11-07 || Draw || align="left" | Pat Kyaw Lin Naing || 66th Karen State Day || Hpa-an Township, Myanmar || Draw || 3 || 3:00
|- style="background:#c5d2ea;"
| 2021-02-12 || Draw || align="left" | Pat Kyaw Lin Naing || 74th Karen State Union Day || Hpa-an Township, Myanmar || Draw || 3 || 3:00
|- style="background:#c5d2ea;"
| 2021-01-30 || Draw || align="left" | Pat Kyaw Lin Naing || 72nd Karen Revolution Day || Hpapun Township, Myanmar || Draw || 3 || 3:00
|- style="background:#c5d2ea;"
| 2020-02-19 || Draw || align="left" | Suphabnoi Sor.Jor.Piek-Uthai || Myanmar vs. Thailand Challenge Fights || Myanmar || Draw || 5 || 3:00
|- style="background:#c5d2ea;"
| 2020-02-08 || Draw || align="left" | Ye Thway Ni|| (194th) Annual Lighting Festival || Kyondoe, Myanmar || Draw || 5 || 3:00
|- style="background:#cfc;"
| 2019-12-26 || Win || align="left" | Yodsaenchai|| Kyein Chaung Challenge Fights ||Payathonzu, Myanmar || KO || 3 ||
|- style="background:#c5d2ea;"
| 2019-11-27 || Draw || align="left" | Kaophodam Sujebamekieow || Myanmar vs. Thailand Challenge Fights || Myaing Gyi Ngu, Myanmar || Draw || 5 || 3:00
|- style="background:#cfc;"
| 2019-11-08 || Win || align="left" | Petchnarin Sathianmuaythai|| 64th Karen State Day ||Hpa-an, Myanmar || KO || 1 ||
|- style="background:#cfc;"
| 2019-10-04 || Win || align="left" | Nguyen Thanh Trung || WLC 10: Fearless Tigers||Mandalay, Myanmar || Decision (Unanimous) || 5 || 3:00  
|- style="background:#cfc;"
| 2019-05-05 || Win || align="left" | Morn Samet|| WLC 8: Karen Spirit || Hpa-an, Myanmar || Decision (Split) || 5 || 3:00
|- style="background:#c5d2ea;"
| 2019-02-19 || Draw || align="left" | Petcheak Kiattikosin || 193rd Annual Lighting Festival || Kyondoe, Myanmar || Draw || 5 || 3:00
|- style="background:#cfc;"
| 2019-02-02 || Win || align="left" | Suea Sor.Bankru || Kyar-Inn village Challenge Fights ||Hlaingbwe Township, Myanmar || KO || 5 ||
|- style="background:#fbb;"
| 2018-09-29 || Loss || align="left" | Pich Mtes Khmang|| WLC 6: Heartless Tigers || Yangon, Myanmar || Decision (Split) || 5 || 3:00
|- style="background:#fbb;"
| 2018-06-02 || Loss || align="left" | Antonio Faria|| WLC 5: Knockout War || Naypyidaw, Myanmar || TKO || 3 || 3:00
|- style="background:#c5d2ea;"
| 2018-04-27 || Draw || align="left" | Ye Thway Ni|| Me Sa Meik Challenge Fights || Hlaingbwe Township, Myanmar || Draw || 5 || 3:00
|- style="background:#cfc;"
| 2018-02-25 || Win || align="left" | Saw Darwait|| Thai-Myanmar Challenge Fights || Kawkareik Township, Myanmar || KO || 2 || 
|- style="background:#fbb;"
| 2018-01-31 || Loss || align="left" | Phu Thai|| International Challenge Fights || Ye Township, Myanmar || KO || 3 || 
|- style="background:#cfc;"
| 2018-01-10 || Win || align="left" | Shukleine Min || Win Sein Taw Ya || Mudon Township, Myanmar || KO || 3 || 
|- style="background:#cfc;"
| 2017-11-04 || Win || align="left" | Pha Kyaw Hae|| WLC 3: Legendary Champions || Yangon, Myanmar || Decision (Unanimous) || 2 || 2:50
|- style="background:#cfc;"
| 2017-10-08 || Win || align="left" | Yan Naing Tun || GTG 5 Challenge Fights || Mandalay, Myanmar || TKO || 3 || 
|- style="background:#cfc;"
| 2017-06-25 || Win || align="left" | Tolabaev Kobilbek|| Lethwei Nation Fight || Yangon, Myanmar || KO || 4 || 
|- style="background:#c5d2ea;"
| 2017-04-16 || Draw || align="left" | Ye Thway Ni|| Lunnya Challenge Fights || Hpa-an, Myanmar || Draw || 5 || 3:00
|- style="background:#c5d2ea;"
| 2017-02-12 || Draw || align="left" | Ye Thway Ni|| Myanmar Traditional Lethwei Fight || Ye Township, Myanmar || Draw || 5 || 3:00
|- style="background:#c5d2ea;"
| 2016-11-27 || Draw || align="left" | Tun Lwin Moe|| Mandalay Rumbling Challenge Fight || Yangon, Myanmar || Draw || 5 || 3:00
|- style="background:#c5d2ea;"
| 2016-11-09 || Draw || align="left" | Kaophodam Sujebamekieow || 61st Karen State Day || Hpa-an, Myanmar || Draw || 5 || 3:00
|- style="background:#fbb;"
| 2016-10-09 || Loss || align="left" | Ye Thway Ni|| GTG Myanmar Lethwei Fight 2016 || Yangon, Myanmar || KO || 2 || 
|- style="background:#cfc;"
| 2016-07-10 || Win || align="left" | Nat Khat Aung|| 2016 Golden Belt Lethwei Championship || Mandalay, Myanmar|| Decision || 5 || 3:00 
|-
! style=background:white colspan=9 |
|- style="background:#cfc;"
| 2016-07-03 || Win || align="left" | Moe Hein|| 2016 Golden Belt Lethwei Championship || Mandalay, Myanmar|| TKO || 2 ||
|- style="background:#c5d2ea;"
| 2016-02-23 || Draw || align="left" | Koun Vong Sohpoan || Laos-Myanmar Challenge Fights || Ye Township, Myanmar|| Draw || 5 || 3:00 
|- style="background:#cfc;"
| 2015-11-14 || Win || align="left" | Phaisithong Kiatpraphat || (60th) Kayin State Day || Hpa-an, Myanmar || KO || 2 ||
|- style="background:#cfc;"
| 2015-09-27 || Win || align="left" | Saw Hla Kyi Htoo|| Mandalay Rumbling Mega Fights || Yangon, Myanmar || KO || 2 ||
|- style="background:#cfc;"
| 2015-06-14 || Win || align="left" | Moe Hein|| 2015 Golden Belt Lethwei Championship || Yangon, Myanmar || KO || 3 ||
|-
! style=background:white colspan=9 |
|- style="background:#cfc;"
| 2015-05-30 || Win || align="left" | Jit Too|| 2015 Golden Belt Lethwei Championship || Yangon, Myanmar || TKO || 2 ||
|- style="background:#cfc;"
| 2015-04-03 || Win || align="left" | Phaisithong Kiatpraphat || Mon-Myanmar-Thai Challenge Fights || Ye Township, Myanmar || KO || 3 ||
|- style="background:#fbb;"
| 2014-07-06 || Loss || align="left" | Wanchana King of Muay Thai || One on One Big Fight || Yangon, Myanmar || KO || 1 || 
|- style="background:#cfc;"
| 2014-03-08 || Win || align="left" | Nuengpetch || Hlakazaing village Challenge Fights || Kyaikmaraw Township, Myanmar || KO || 3 ||
|-
| colspan=9 | Legend:

Mixed martial arts record

|-
| Loss
| align=center| 1–1 
| Ye Thway Ni
| Decision (unanimous)
| ONE Championship: Pursuit of Greatness
| 
| align=center| 3
| align=center| 5:00
| Yangon, Myanmar 
| 
|-
| Win
| align=center| 1–0 
| Saw Darwait 
| TKO (punches)
| ONE Championship: Spirit of a Warrior
| 
| align=center| 1
| align=center| 2:48 
| Yangon, Myanmar 
|

References

External links
 Facebook page

Living people
1992 births
Burmese Lethwei practitioners
Burmese male mixed martial artists
Mixed martial artists utilizing Lethwei
Burmese people of Karen descent
Southeast Asian Games gold medalists for Myanmar